John Francis Moore may refer to:

John Francis Moore (bishop) (1942–2010), Irish priest who was a bishop in Africa
John Francis Moore (writer), American comic book writer for Marvel Comics and DC Comics
John Francis Moore (politician) (1816–1870), English lumber merchant who was mayor of Hamilton, Ontario
John Francis Moore (sculptor) (died 1809), British sculptor prominent in the late 18th century whose work can be found amongst the important figures in Westminster Abbey

See also
John Moore (disambiguation)